Manuell is a surname. Notable people with the surname include:

Dolores Manuell Gómez Angulo (born 1948), Mexican politician
Eric Manuell (born 1941), Australian politician

See also
Manuel (name)
Manuelle